Keith Coleman may refer to:

 Keith Coleman (footballer) (born 1951), retired English footballer 
 Keith Coleman, owner of Keith Coleman Racing, a NASCAR Busch Series team